The 2013 NCAA Division I Men's Basketball Championship Game was the finals of the 2013 NCAA Division I men's basketball tournament and it determined the national champion for the 2012–13 NCAA Division I men's basketball season. The 2013 National Championship Game was played on April 8, 2013 at the Georgia Dome in Atlanta, Georgia, and featured the 2013 Midwest Regional Champions, #1-seeded Louisville, and the 2013 South Regional Champions, #4-seeded Michigan. Louisville's title was subsequently vacated by the NCAA on June 15, 2017 as the result of sex, stripper, and/or prostitution scandal related to both players on this team, as well as potential recruits. This decision was upheld on February 20, 2018.

Participants

Michigan

Michigan, who was led by 2013 national player of the year Trey Burke, was a #4 seed in the South Regional of the 2013 NCAA tournament. In the 2nd round, Glenn Robinson III scored 21 points to lead the Wolverines past South Dakota State 71-56. In the 3rd Round, Michigan crushed VCU with a 78–53 win to advance to the Sweet 16 for the 1st time since 1994. Against Kansas, Burke made a long game-tying three-pointer with 4.2 seconds left to send the game to overtime, and Michigan would then win to advance to the Elite Eight. Michigan routed Florida 79-59 to advance to the Final Four for the 1st time since 1993. Against Syracuse, with Michigan leading 58–56 with 19.2 seconds left, Jordan Morgan took the charge and Brandon Triche was called for an offensive foul. Then, Jon Horford made 1 of 2 free throws for a 59–56 lead. With 6 seconds left, Trevor Cooney missed a jump shot and Tim Hardaway Jr. got the rebound, then Caris LeVert threw it all the way to Morgan, who would dunk it in for a 61–56 win over Syracuse and a trip to the 2013 National Championship Game.

Michigan was competing for its 2nd ever National Title being in its 6th national title game, its 1st since the 1993 National Title Game when the Fab Five was around.

Louisville

Louisville was the #1 overall seed in the 2013 NCAA tournament and was placed in the Midwest Regional. Louisville had no trouble beating North Carolina A&T in the 2nd round with an easy 79–48 win. In the 3rd Round, Russ Smith scored 27 points as Louisville crushed Colorado State 82-56. In the Sweet 16, Russ Smith scored 31 points to beat Oregon 77-69 for a trip to the Elite Eight. Then the Cardinals overcame Kevin Ware's injury to beat Duke 85-63 and advance to the 2013 Final Four. Louisville survived the surprising Wichita State team to advance to the 2013 National Championship Game.

This was Louisville's 3rd trip to the National Title Game and it also vied for its 3rd national title, which was later vacated.

Starting lineups

 (number corresponds to draft round)

† = 2013 All-American

Game summary

First half

Trey Burke scored seven quick points to get Michigan out to an early 7–3 lead. But then he picked up two fouls and would be forced to sit on the bench. Spike Albrecht, replacing him, made four consecutive three-pointers leading to a 17-point first-half performance and Michigan would be up 35–23. But, Luke Hancock made four consecutive three-pointers to cut the Michigan lead to 38–37 at halftime.

Second half
The 2nd half featured several lead changes, then with 5:09 remaining, Trey Burke was called for a controversial foul on a block attempt of a Peyton Siva layup. Siva made both free throws for a Louisville 69–64 lead. With 3:27 left, Luke Hancock made a three-pointer to give Louisville a 76–66 lead. Michigan took the game to an 80-76 deficit with 14 seconds left, but Siva made two free throws to give Louisville an 82–76 win. With 22 points, Hancock was named the 2013 NCAA Tournament Most Outstanding Player.

References

Notes

NCAA Division I Men's Basketball Championship Game
NCAA Division I Men's Basketball Championship Games
Louisville Cardinals men's basketball
Michigan Wolverines men's basketball
College basketball tournaments in Georgia (U.S. state)
Basketball competitions in Atlanta
NCAA Division I Men's Basketball Championship Game
2013 in Atlanta